Suggan Buggan is a ghost town in the remote wilderness of north-eastern Gippsland in Victoria, Australia, 8 km from the border with New South Wales. About five or six  people live there permanently. The postcode is 3885.

The traditional custodians of the area are the Australian Aboriginal Bidawal and Nindi-Ngudjam Ngarigu Monero peoples. The name of the locality supposedly derives from the Aboriginal phrase "bukkan bukkan", which describes bags made from grass.

Suggan Buggan is surrounded by the Alpine National Park. There is a free camping area on the Suggan Buggan River. Several historical remains exist, including a well preserved 1860s wooden schoolhouse and an old house.

Gallery

References

Ghost towns in Victoria (Australia)
Towns in Victoria (Australia)
Shire of East Gippsland